Chandos House is a Grade I listed building at N° 2 Queen Anne Street, Marylebone, in central London. It was designed by Robert Adam, the most prominent architect in Georgian Britain, and built by William Adam and Company. It is seen as the first of a series of large townhouses in London, including 20 St. James's Square and Derby House.

Construction
The house was built speculatively with monies from the Adam family and from the banker Sir George Colebrooke, later to be an Adam client himself. It was started in 1769 and finished in 1771, on a plot between another Adam house to the west and the garden wall of Foley House to the east, on land which was part of the Duke of Portland's estate. The façade is of Craigleith stone, perhaps as an advertisement for the quarry to the west of Edinburgh on which the Adam brothers' firm had recently taken a lease.

Notable occupants
In 1813, the house was still home to Anna Eliza Brydges, Duchess of Chandos, whom the 3rd Duke of Chandos had married as his second wife in 1777. However, following the sudden death of the duke in 1789, the duchess was declared a lunatic. As a consequence, she was confined to the house and lost control of her estates. In May 1815, the unexpired portion of the lease (51 years) was sold by her executors and purchased by the Austrian embassy.

The first resident ambassador was Prince Esterházy, and for the next 25 years, Chandos House was the scene of entertainment on the most lavish scale. Contemporary newspapers record his wasteful splendour and oriental pomp. Eventually, his extravagance proved his ruin. He left the embassy in 1842 and was succeeded by Baron von Neumann. In 1866, the Austrian embassy moved to Belgrave Square in Belgravia, where the Embassy of Austria is still housed currently.

Newspaper magnate Gomer Berry (later Viscount Kemsley), became the last private owner of Chandos House, buying it from Anthony Ashley-Cooper, 9th Earl of Shaftesbury in 1927. It was his London home and the venue for his London entertaining until 1959 when the house was sold to the Royal Society of Medicine. Chandos House is currently owned by Cosmetic Doctor at Work Limited.

References

External links

Chandos House website

Robert Adam buildings
Grade I listed buildings in the City of Westminster
Houses in the City of Westminster
Grade I listed houses in London